Frank Sedgman and Doris Hart successfully defended their title, defeating Enrique Morea and Thelma Long in the final, 4–6, 6–3, 6–4 to win the mixed doubles tennis title at the 1952 Wimbledon Championships.

Seeds

  Frank Sedgman /  Doris Hart (champions)
  Ken McGregor /  Louise Brough (semifinals)
  Eric Sturgess /  Shirley Fry (fourth round)
  Don Candy /  Pat Todd (semifinals)

Draw

Finals

Top half

Section 1

Section 2

Section 3

Section 4

Bottom half

Section 5

Section 6

Section 7

Section 8

References

External links

X=Mixed Doubles
Wimbledon Championship by year – Mixed doubles